Spruance may refer to:

 Spruance (surname)
 Spruance-class destroyer, the primary destroyer built for the U.S. Navy during the 1970s
 USS Spruance, the name of two United States Navy ships named after Admiral Raymond A. Spruance